Fábio Emanuel Rodrigues Moura (born 17 January 1992 in Santo Tirso, Porto District) is a Portuguese footballer who plays for C.D. Trofense as a forward.

External links

1992 births
Living people
People from Santo Tirso
Portuguese footballers
Association football forwards
C.D. Trofense players
Sportspeople from Porto District